"Aubrey" is a song written and composed by American singer-songwriter David Gates, and originally recorded by the soft rock group Bread, of which Gates was the leader and primary music producer. It appeared on Bread's 1972 album Guitar Man. The single lasted 11 weeks on the Billboard Hot 100 chart, peaking at number 15.  In Canada the song reached only number 41 on the pop singles chart, but reached number 6 on the adult contemporary chart.  In New Zealand, "Aubrey" reached number 8.

Background
David Gates wrote the song after watching Breakfast at Tiffany's starring Audrey Hepburn.

American actress and comedian Aubrey Plaza was named after the song.

Musical structure and lyrics
The song features David Gates' solo voice, with no backup vocals or drumming. It relies on various melodic resources such as orchestral strings, acoustic guitar, celeste, and orchestra bells. In the lyrics, the singer talks about a longing for a girl named Aubrey for whom he had unrequited love ("the hearts that never played in tune"); perhaps a first love.

Chart history

Weekly charts

Cover versions
"Aubrey" was later recorded by Perry Como and included on his 1973 album  And I Love You So.

Samples
A soul-jazz interpretation of the main melody by saxophonist Grover Washington Jr. was sampled on the 1998 song "Step to My Girl" by Oakland-based hip-hop group Souls of Mischief. This version provided inspiration in turn for the song "Step" by American indie rock band Vampire Weekend.

References

1972 singles
Bread (band) songs
Songs written by David Gates
1972 songs
Elektra Records singles